Do Balutan (also Romanized as Do Balūţān; also known as Do Ballūţān-e Andīkā and Dobalootan Andika) is a village in Abezhdan Rural District, Abezhdan District, Andika County, Khuzestan Province, Iran. At the 2006 census, its population was 202, in 26 families.

References 

Populated places in Andika County